Buffalo is an unincorporated community in Anderson County, Tennessee, United States.

Notes

Unincorporated communities in Anderson County, Tennessee
Unincorporated communities in Tennessee